Little Creek is a stream in the U.S. state of Montana. It is a tributary to Addition Creek.

According to tradition, Little Creek was named in celebration of the birth of firstborn child of forestry official Donald Bruce (himself namesake to Bruce Creek).

References

Rivers of Montana
Rivers of Flathead County, Montana